Arthur William Christian (7 October 1893 – 8 January 1956) was an Australian politician who represented the South Australian House of Assembly seats of Flinders from 1933 to 1938 and Eyre from 1938 to 1956 for the Liberal and Country League.

References

1893 births
1956 deaths
Members of the South Australian House of Assembly
Liberal and Country League politicians
20th-century Australian politicians